The Portugal national futsal team represents Portugal in international men's futsal competitions and is controlled by the Portuguese Football Federation. They are the reigning FIFA Futsal World Cup champions, the current and back-to-back winners of the UEFA Futsal Championship, and the first team to win the Futsal Finalissima.

Portugal has won the 2021 FIFA Futsal World Cup, the European Championship in 2018 and 2022 and the 2022 Futsal Finalissima. They are one of only four teams to win the World Cup as well as one of four to be crowned European champions and the winners of the first ever Futsal Finalissima. Portugal are, together with Spain, the only team from UEFA to be world champions and the only team, also alongside Spain, to successfully defend their European title. They are the only team to win the World Cup title as reigning European champions.

Results and fixtures
The following is a list of match results in the last 12 months, as well as any future matches that have been scheduled.
Legend

2021

Players

Current squad
The following players were called up to the squad for the UEFA 2024 FIFA Futsal World Cup qualification match against Belarus on 7 March 2023.
Caps and goals are correct as of 8 March 2023.
Head coach: Jorge Braz

Recent call-ups
The following players have also been called up to the Portugal squad within the last 12 months.

COV Player withdrew from the squad due to contracting COVID-19.
INJ Player withdrew from the squad due to an injury.
PRE Preliminary squad.
RET Retired from international futsal.

Records

Players in bold are still active for the national team.

Most appearances

Top goalscorers

Competitive record
A gold background colour indicates that Portugal won the tournament, a silver background colour indicates they were runner-up, a bronze background colour indicates a third place in the tournament, and a blue background indicates a fourth-place finish. A green border colour indicates that the tournament was hosted in Portugal.

FIFA Futsal World Cup

UEFA Futsal Championship

Futsal Finalissima

FIFUSA/AMF Futsal World Cup

Grand Prix de Futsal

Confederations Cup

Futsal Mundialito

Note: Draws include knockout matches decided on penalty kicks.

References

 
European national futsal teams
National